James Edward McInally (born 19 February 1964) is a Scottish football manager and former player, who was most recently the manager of Scottish League One club Peterhead. He played for Dundee United for 10 seasons in which he won the 1993–94 Scottish Cup and played in the 1987 UEFA Cup Final. At United he was also a three time Scottish Cup runner-up.

McInally also played for Celtic, Nottingham Forest (1985 Player of the Year), Coventry City, Raith Rovers, Dundee, Sligo Rovers and East Fife. He gained 10 full caps with the Scotland national football team for whom he played at the UEFA Euro 1992 finals in Sweden.

His management career began with a player-manager role at Sligo Rovers. After his playing retirement he took charge of Greenock Morton, East Stirlingshire and was then manager of Peterhead for 11 years.

Playing career

Celtic and loan to Dundee
McInally began senior his career at left back with Celtic, the team he supported as a boy. He won Scotland youth caps and then debuted under Billy McNeil on 28 August 1982 in a 7-1 league cup victory at Dunfermline Athletic. However McNeil left in June 1983 and was replaced by Davie Hay who had no plans for McInally at Celtic. In January 1984 McInally was loaned to Dundee where he scored twice in his 11 league games. McInally left after only one appearance for Celtic in each of the league and the Scottish Cup to add to his debut in the league cup against Dunfermline.

Nottingham Forest

He was flown down by Brian Clough to watch Nottingham Forest against Manchester United for the final league game of the 1983/84 season (Forest won 2--0). He was a guest of Forest at the game with two other players they were signing, Johnny Metgod and Gary Megson. McInally's Forest debut was in and end of season tour in Australia. While living in Nottingham's Balmoral Hotel he spent Christmas as a guest at the Clough household. McInally was player of the year at the end of his first Forest season. Despite this success he stayed at Forest for only 18 months. In the summer of 1985 Stuart Pearce was signed by Clough. Pearce was the makeweight in a £300,000 deal bringing Coventry centre-back Ian Butterworth to Forest. So unsure was Pearce of his footballing future that after the transfer he advertised his services as an electrician in Forest's match-day programme. However Pearce immediately established himself at left back making 30 league appearances before the end of the season. McInally played beside Pearce in some games that season before leaving after his last game on 26 December 1985. McInally's last game was a 1–0 win away at Birmingham City.

Coventry City
McInally moved in the opposite direction to Pearce joining Dave Bowman at Coventry City for £112,000. He played five first team games there before he and Bowman double transferred to Scotland at the end of the season.

Dundee United
McInally and Bowman joined Dundee United in the summer of 1986 in a £140,000 joint transfer. At Tannadice McInally quickly became an effective defensive midfielder and played an important part in Dundee United's run to the UEFA Cup Final in his first season. McInally scored the opener in the home leg of the third round tie against Hadjuk Split. United beat F.C. Barcelona home and away and then eliminated Borussia Mönchengladbach in the semi final. They lost 2–1 on aggregate in the final to IFK Goteborg.

Bowman and McInally played in three losing Dundee United Scottish final teams. These were in 1987 to St Mirren, 1988 to Celtic and the 1991 final to Motherwell in which Bowman scored. They collected a winners medal from the 1994 Scottish Cup Final win against Rangers.

Raith Rovers

In 1995, following United's relegation to the Scottish Football League First Division, McInally remained in the Premier Division by joining newly promoted Raith Rovers as player/coach.

In early 1996, McInally was due to join Aberdeen in a swap deal for Peter Hetherston, and was paraded at a Pittodrie news conference. Hetherston however failed a medical and the move collapsed.

Dundee United (second spell)

A few weeks into the following season, McInally moved back to Tannadice and made sixteen appearances.

Dundee
He then moved back to Dundee as a player-coach at Dens Park.

Scotland

McInally's first full cap was on 1 April 1987 losing 4–1 in a European Championship qualifier away to Belgium. He was selected for the Scotland squad for the UEFA Euro 1992 finals in Sweden. In Sweden he played in Scotland's third and final game as a 65th-minute substitute for Ally McCoist. The Scots won that game 3–0 against the CIS. McInally had played in two of the qualifiers both of which were 1–1 draws against Bulgaria. His 10th and final cap was the 5–0 defeat away to Portugal on 28 April 1993 that all but extinguished Scottish hopes of qualifying for the 1994 FIFA World Cup.

Management career

Sligo Rovers

McInally joined Sligo Rovers as manager at the start of the 1999–00 season but early results did not go his way and he left the club for personal reasons. He returned to Scotland and joined the coaching staff of Celtic, working with the club's youth teams.

Greenock Morton

McInally moved back into management as he was appointed manager of Scottish Second Division side Greenock Morton. In the 2005–06 season, he led Morton to 2nd place in the Division after which they were subsequently denied promotion by losing to Peterhead in the play-offs. McInally stated his intention to win the Second Division in the 2006–07 season, with that objective met in mid April when nearest challengers Stirling Albion fell out of mathematical contention. He won the August 2006 Second Division Manager of the Month award, along the way. He resigned in February 2008 after a run of poor results allowed Morton to slip into ninth place in the First Division.

East Stirlingshire

On 13 March 2008, McInally was named the new manager of Third Division strugglers East Stirlingshire, succeeding Gordon Wylde who resigned a month earlier. McInally was named November 2008 Manager of the Month for the Third Division by the Scottish Football League. He then won the same award in February and September 2009, but resigned in May 2011 after the club finished second bottom of the 2010–11 Scottish Third Division.

Peterhead

McInally was appointed manager of Peterhead in October 2011. He led the Blue Toon to its first trophy as a football league club by winning the Scottish League Two title in season 2013–14. The club were relegated back to the fourth tier via the play-offs in season 2016–17. McInally offered to resign after Peterhead failed to win promotion in 2017–18, but the board of directors asked him to stay on. He then won the Scottish League Two title the next season, securing it on the last day.

He resigned on 14 November 2022 after 11 years in the job, with Peterhead sitting bottom of the 2022–23 Scottish League One table.

Career statistics

International appearances

Managerial record

Honours and awards

Player
Nottingham Forest
 Player of the Year 1984–85

Dundee United
 1987 UEFA Cup Finalist
 1993–94 Scottish Cup winner
 Hall of Fame 2015 inductee

Manager
Greenock Morton
Scottish Second Division: 2006–07

Peterhead
Scottish League Two (2): 2013–14, 2018–19

References

External links
 
 
 FitbaStats - Celtic

1964 births
Celtic F.C. non-playing staff
Celtic F.C. players
Coventry City F.C. players
Dundee F.C. players
Dundee United F.C. players
East Stirlingshire F.C. managers
Greenock Morton F.C. managers
Greenock Morton F.C. non-playing staff
League of Ireland managers
League of Ireland players
Living people
Nottingham Forest F.C. players
Peterhead F.C. managers
Raith Rovers F.C. players
Scotland international footballers
Scotland under-21 international footballers
Scottish Football League managers
Scottish Football League players
Scottish Premier League players
Scottish Football League representative players
Scottish football managers
Scottish footballers
Scottish Professional Football League managers
Sligo Rovers F.C. managers
Footballers from Glasgow
English Football League players
UEFA Euro 1992 players
Association football midfielders
Expatriate association footballers in the Republic of Ireland
Sligo Rovers F.C. players